Veisiejis Lake is in the Lazdijai district of southern Lithuania, about  southwest of Veisiejai city. The lake is narrow, like a river, with sharp, high shores. The lake connects with Lake Niedus.

Around the lake are the villages of Paveisiejai, Navikai, Gerveliai, Sapiegiškiai, Paveisininkai, Burbai, Palačionys, Purviniai, Subačiai, and Kalviai.

The Veisiejis lake had a surface area of  until 1956, but after the construction of the Kapčiamiestis hydroelectric power station, Veisiejis joined with Nadorius and Uosis lakes.

Sources 
 

Veisiejis